HETE may refer to:
 High Energy Transient Explorer
 Hydroxyeicosatetraenoic acids:
 5-Hydroxyeicosatetraenoic acid
 8-hydroxyeicosatetraenoic acid (8-HETE)
 12-Hydroxyeicosatetraenoic acid (12-HETE)
 15-Hydroxyeicosatetraenoic acid (15-HETE)
 19-Hydroxyeicosatetraenoic acid (19-HETE) 
 20-Hydroxyeicosatetraenoic acid (20-HETE)
For further details of these and other hydroxeicosatetraenoic acids, e.g. 18-HETE, 17-HETE, and 16-HETE, see eicosanoid and lipoxygenase pages.